Chinese input methods are methods that allow a computer user to input Chinese characters. Most, if not all, Chinese input methods fall into one of two categories: phonetic readings or root shapes. Methods under the phonetic category usually are easier to learn but are less efficient, thus resulting in slower typing speeds because they typically require users to choose from a list of phonetically similar characters for input, whereas methods under the root shape category allow very precise and speedy input but have a steep learning curve because they often require a thorough understanding of a character's strokes and composition.

Other methods allow users to write characters directly onto touchscreens, such as those found on mobile phones and tablet computers.

History

Chinese input methods predate the computer. One of the early attempts was an electro-mechanical Chinese typewriter Ming kwai which was invented by Lin Yutang, a prominent Chinese writer, in the 1940s.  It assigned thirty base shapes or strokes to different keys and adopted a new way of categorizing Chinese characters. But the typewriter was not produced commercially and Lin soon found himself deeply in debt.

Before the 1980s, Chinese publishers hired teams of workers and selected a few thousand type pieces from an enormous Chinese character set. Chinese government agencies entered characters using a long, complicated list of Chinese telegraph codes, which assigned different numbers to each character. During the early computer era, Chinese characters were categorized by their radicals or Pinyin romanization, but results were less than satisfactory.

In the 1970s to 1980s, large keyboards with thousands of keys were used to input Chinese. Each key was mapped to several Chinese characters. To type a character, one pressed the character key and then a selection key. There were also experimental "radical keyboards" with dozens to several hundreds keys. Chinese characters were decomposed into "radicals", each of which was represented by a key. Unwieldy and difficult to use, these keyboards became obsolete after the introduction of Cangjie input method, the first method to use only the standard keyboard and make Chinese touch typing possible.

Chu Bong-Foo invented a common input method in 1976 with his Cangjie input method, which assigns different "roots" to each key on a standard computer keyboard. With this method, for example, the character 日 is assigned to the A key, and 月 is assigned to B. Typing them together will result in the character 明 ("bright").

Despite its steeper learning curve, this method remains popular in Chinese communities that use traditional Chinese characters, such as Hong Kong and Taiwan; the method allows very precise input, thus allowing users to type more efficiently and quickly, provided they are familiar with the fairly complicated rules of the method. It was the first method that allowed users to enter more than a hundred Chinese characters per minute. Its popularity is also helped by its omnipresence on traditional Chinese computer systems, since Chu has given up its patent in 1982, stating that it should be part of the cultural asset. Developers of Chinese systems can adopt it freely, and users do not have the hassle of it being absent on devices with Chinese support. Cangjie input programs supporting large CJK character set have been developed.

All methods have their strengths and weaknesses. The pinyin method can be learned rapidly but its maximum input rate is limited. The Wubi takes longer to learn, but expert typists can enter text much more rapidly with it than with phonetic methods. However, Wubi is proprietary, and a version of it has become freely available only after its inventor lost a patent lawsuit in 1997.

Due to these complexities, there is no "standard" method.

In mainland China, the wubi (shape-based) and pinyin methods such as Sogou Pinyin and Google Pinyin are the most popular; in Taiwan, Cangjie, Dayi, Boshiamy, and zhuyin predominate; and in Hong Kong and Macau, the Cangjie is most often taught in schools, while a few schools teach CKC Chinese Input System.

Other methods include handwriting recognition, OCR and voice recognition. The computer itself must first be "trained" before the first or second of these methods are used; that is, the new user enters the system in a special "learning mode" so that the system can learn to identify their handwriting or speech patterns. The latter two methods are used less frequently than keyboard-based input methods and suffer from relatively high error rates, especially when used without proper "training", though higher error rates are an acceptable trade-off to many users. In recent years, online IME have become more scarce, owing to the proliferation of cellphones and apps.

Categories

Phonetic-based

The user enters pronunciations that are converted into relevant Chinese characters. The user must select the desired character from homophones, which are common in Chinese. Modern systems, such as Sogou Pinyin and Google Pinyin, predict the desired characters based on context and user preferences. For example, if one enters the sounds jicheng, the software will type 繼承 (to inherit), but if jichengche is entered,  計程車 (taxi) will appear.

Various Chinese dialects complicate the system. Phonetic methods are mainly based on standard pinyin, Zhuyin/Bopomofo, and Jyutping in China, Taiwan, and Hong Kong, respectively.  Input methods based on other varieties of Chinese, like Hakka or Minnan, also exist.

While the phonetic system is easy to learn, choosing appropriate Chinese characters slows typing speed. Most users report a typing speed of fifty characters per minute, though some reach over one hundred per minute. With some phonetic IMEs (Input Method Editors), in addition to predictive input based on previous conversions, it is possible for users to create custom dictionary entries for frequently used characters and phrases, potentially lowering the number of characters required to evoke it.

Shuangpin 

Shuangpin (雙拼; 双拼), literally dual spell, is a stenographical phonetic input method based on hanyu pinyin that reduces the number of keystrokes for one Chinese character to two by distributing every vowel and consonant composed of more than one letter to a specific key. In most Shuangpin layout schemes such as Xiaohe, Microsoft 2003 and Ziranma, the most frequently used vowels are placed on the middle layer, reducing the risk of repetitive strain injury.

Shuangpin is supported by a large number of pinyin input software including QQ, Microsoft Bing Pinyin, Sogou Pinyin and Google Pinyin.

Shape-based 

 Cangjie input method (倉頡; 仓颉; Tsang-chieh)
 Simplified Cangjie (簡易倉頡, known as 速成 or 'Quick' on Windows systems and 'Sucheng' on Mac OS X systems)
 CKC Chinese Input System (縱橫輸入法)
 Boshiamy method (嘸蝦米)
 Dayi method (大易)
 Array input method (行列)
 Four-Corner Method (四角碼; 四角码)
 Oxis Chinese Character Finder
 Q9 method (九方)
 Shouwei method (首尾字型)
 Stroke count method (筆畫; 笔画)
 Stroke method (筆劃; 笔划)
 Wubi method (五筆字型; 五笔字型)
 Wubihua method (五筆畫; 五笔画)
 Zhengma method (鄭碼; 郑码)
 Biaoxingma method (表形碼; 表形码)
 Shou-wei Hao-ma method (首尾號碼)
 Knot DNA method (筆結碼)
 TigerCode method (虎码)

Hybrid 
 Tze-loi method (子來; 子来)
  (認知碼; 认知码)
 Cong Ming Da Zi (聪明打字, Released 2011)

Others 
 Chinese telegraph code (中文電碼)

Examples of keyboard layouts

Software

Microsoft IME
Sogou Pinyin
Google Pinyin

Notes

See also 
 List of input methods for Unix platforms
 List of CJK fonts
 Japanese language and computers
 Japanese input methods
 Korean language and computers
 Vietnamese language and computers
 Han unification
 Character amnesia
 Chinese character encodings:
 Big5
 Guobiao code (GB)
 Neima (內碼)
 Unicode
 Telegraph code (電報碼)

External links

Information and articles 
 What Does a Chinese Keyboard Look Like?, article by Slate.com
 Overview of Input Methods, by Sebastien Bruggeman.
 中文輸入法世界 Chinese input method news.
 The engineering daring that led to the first Chinese personal computer. With 1,000s of Chinese characters and limited memory, inventors of the Sinotype III had to push the limits of early machines. by Tom Mullaney, June 29, 2021, techcrunch.com
 How intensive modding ushered in China’s computer revolution: Early Chinese engineers needed to constantly push against the boundaries of 'alphabetic order,'by Tom Mullaney, October 24, 2021, techcrunch.com
 The computer pioneer who built modern China, By Leila McNeill, 19th February 2020, bbc website.

Tutorials 
What is an Input Method Editor and how do I use it?, a Microsoft article about Windows XP's Input Method Editor.
IME Tutorial, tutorial on how to use Microsoft Global IME for pre-Windows 2000 systems.
 Setting Up Your Computer to Type Chinese, website cheng-tsui.com

Tools 

Microsoft Voice Recognition
Typing Chinese Online with Optional Tone Input
Online Cantonese Input
Type in Chinese online (IME) Online IME using the pinyin system. 
InputKing Online Input System, an online IME with multiple input methods, supporting both simplified and traditional characters.
G6 Chinese Input Method (preinstalled on some Android phones e.g. by HTC)
NJStar Software Corp. (南极星 Nanjixing): Chinese, Japanese, and Korean language software solutions for use with Microsoft Windows operating systems. Solutions include keyboard & hand-written input tools, English translation tools, desktop publishing, and educational tools.
 CJKV Input Method Editors for MS Word VBA macros for input Asian characters and for text conversion.
 HanziLookupJS Free, open-source Chinese handwriting recognition in Javascript.

Articles containing video clips
Han character input
Chinese-language computing